A near-threatened species is a species which has been categorized as "Near Threatened" (NT) by the International Union for Conservation of Nature as that may be vulnerable to endangerment in the near future, but it does not currently qualify for the threatened status.

The IUCN notes the importance of re-evaluating near-threatened taxon at appropriate intervals.

The rationale used for near-threatened taxa usually includes the criteria of vulnerable which are plausible or nearly met, such as reduction in numbers or range. Near-threatened species evaluated from 2001 onwards may also be ones which are dependent on conservation efforts to prevent their becoming threatened, whereas before this conservation-dependent species were given a separate category ("Conservation Dependent").

Additionally, the 402 conservation-dependent taxa may also be considered near-threatened.

IUCN Categories and Criteria version 2.3 

Before 2001, the IUCN used the version 2.3 Categories and Criteria to assign conservation status, which included a separate category for conservation-dependent species ("Conservation Dependent", LR/cd). With this category system, Near Threatened and Conservation Dependent were both subcategories of the category "Lower Risk". Taxa which were last evaluated before 2001 may retain their LR/cd or LR/nt status, although had the category been assigned with the same information today the species would be designated simply "Near Threatened (NT)" in either case.

Gallery

See also
IUCN Red List near threatened species, ordered by taxonomic rank.
:Category:IUCN Red List near threatened species, ordered alphabetically.
List of near threatened amphibians
List of near threatened arthropods
List of near threatened birds
List of near threatened fishes
List of near threatened insects
List of near threatened invertebrates
List of near threatened mammals
List of near threatened molluscs
List of near threatened reptiles

References

External links 
List of Near Threatened species as identified by the IUCN Red List of Threatened Species

 
 
Biota by conservation status
IUCN Red List
Environmental conservation